The 2023 ATP Tour is the global elite men's professional tennis circuit organised by the Association of Tennis Professionals (ATP) for the 2023 tennis season. The 2023 ATP Tour calendar comprises the Grand Slam tournaments, supervised by the International Tennis Federation (ITF), the ATP Finals, the ATP Tour Masters 1000, the United Cup, the ATP 500 series and the ATP 250 series. Also included in the 2023 calendar are the Davis Cup (organised by the ITF), Next Gen ATP Finals, Laver Cup, and Hopman Cup (sanctioned by the ITF), none of which distribute ranking points. 2023 marks the return of the ATP tournaments in China after strict COVID-19 protocols in the country.

Schedule

This is the schedule of events on the 2023 calendar.

January

February

March

April

May

June

July

August

September

October

November

Statistical information
These tables present the number of singles (S), doubles (D), and mixed doubles (X) titles won by each player and each nation during the season, within all the tournament categories of the 2023 calendar : the Grand Slam tournaments, the ATP Finals, the ATP Tour Masters 1000, the ATP Tour 500 tournaments, and the ATP Tour 250 tournaments. The players/nations are sorted by:
 Total number of titles (a doubles title won by two players representing the same nation counts as only one win for the nation);
 Cumulated importance of those titles (one Grand Slam win equalling two Masters 1000 wins, one undefeated ATP Finals win equalling one-and-a-half Masters 1000 win, one Masters 1000 win equalling two 500 events wins, one 500 event win equalling two 250 events wins);
 A singles > doubles > mixed doubles hierarchy;
 Alphabetical order (by family names for players).

Titles won by player

Titles won by nation

Titles information
The following players won their first main circuit title in singles, doubles or mixed doubles:
Singles
  Tallon Griekspoor – Pune (draw)
  Wu Yibing – Dallas (draw)

Doubles
  Rinky Hijikata – Australian Open (draw)
  Jason Kubler – Australian Open (draw)
  Maxime Cressy – Dubai (draw)
  Andrea Pellegrino – Santiago (draw)

Mixed doubles
  Rafael Matos – Australian Open (draw)

The following players defended a main circuit title in singles, doubles, or mixed doubles:
Doubles
  Andrés Molteni – Córdoba (draw)
  Marcelo Arévalo – Delray Beach (draw)
  Jean-Julien Rojer – Delray Beach (draw)

Best ranking
The following players achieved their career high ranking in this season inside top 50 (in bold the players who entered the top 10 or became the world No. 1 for the first time):
 Singles 

  Miomir Kecmanović (reached place No. 27 on January 16)
  Jack Draper (reached place No. 38 on January 16)
  Lorenzo Musetti (reached place No. 18 on January 30)
  Sebastian Korda (reached place No. 26 on January 30)
  Frances Tiafoe (reached place No. 14 on February 6)
  Jiří Lehečka (reached place No. 37 on February 6)
  Benjamin Bonzi (reached place No. 42 on February 6)
  Constant Lestienne (reached place No. 48 on February 6)
  Tommy Paul (reached place No. 18 on February 13)
  J. J. Wolf (reached place No. 39 on February 13)
  Marc-Andrea Hüsler (reached place No. 47 on February 13)
  Federico Coria (reached place No. 49 on February 13)
  Yoshihito Nishioka (reached place No. 32 on February 20)
  Taylor Fritz (reached place No. 5 on February 27)
  Holger Rune (reached place No. 8 on March 6)
  Tallon Griekspoor (reached place No. 36 on March 6)
  Alejandro Davidovich Fokina (reached place No. 25 on March 20)
  Ben Shelton (reached place No. 39 on March 20)
  Bernabé Zapata Miralles (reached place No. 41 on March 20)

 Doubles 

  Harri Heliövaara (reached place No. 9 on January 9)
  Nathaniel Lammons (reached place No. 41 on January 16)
  Matwe Middelkoop (reached place No. 18 on February 6)
  Rafael Matos (reached place No. 26 on February 6)
  David Vega Hernández (reached place No. 28 on February 13)
  Jan Zieliński (reached place No. 14 on February 20)
  Jason Kubler (reached place No. 29 on February 20)
  Rinky Hijikata (reached place No. 32 on February 20)
  Hugo Nys (reached place No. 19 on February 27)
  Fabien Reboul (reached place No. 45 on February 27)
  Sadio Doumbia (reached place No. 48 on February 27)
  Alexander Erler (reached place No. 42 on March 6)
  Lucas Miedler (reached place No. 43 on March 6)
  Matthew Ebden (reached place No. 18 on March 20)
  Jackson Withrow (reached place No. 42 on March 20)
  Andrea Vavassori (reached place No. 50 on March 20)

ATP rankings

Below are the tables for the yearly ATP Race rankings and the ATP rankings of the top 20 singles players, doubles players, and doubles teams.

Singles

No. 1 ranking

Doubles

No. 1 ranking

Point distribution
Points are awarded as follows:

Prize money leaders

Retirements
The following is a list of notable players (winners of a main tour title, and/or part of the ATP rankings top 100 in singles, or top 100 in doubles, for at least one week) who announced their retirement from professional tennis, became inactive (after not playing for more than 52 weeks), or were permanently banned from playing, during the 2023 season:

  Thomaz Bellucci (born 30 December 1987 in Tietê, Brazil)  joined the professional tour in 2005 and reached a career-high ranking of No. 21 in singles in July 2010 and No. 70 in doubles in July 2013. He won four singles titles and one doubles title. On 12 January, Bellucci announced that he would make his final professional appearance at the Rio Open in February. He played Sebastian Baez in the first round and lost in straight sets.
  Malek Jaziri (born 20 January 1984 in Bizerte, Tunisia) joined the professional tour in 2003. He reached a career-high ranking of No. 42 in singles in January 2019 and No. 73 in August 2019. Jaziri announced he would retire at the Dubai Tennis Championships, where he lost in the first round to Alejandro Davidovich Fokina.

  Feliciano López (born 20 September 1981 in Toledo, Spain) joined the professional tour in 1997. López reached a career-high ranking of No. 12 in singles in March 2015 and has won seven singles titles across all three surfaces. He also reached his career-high ranking in doubles of No. 9 in November 2016 after winning the French Open title earlier that year with partner Marc López, his only major title, and has won five additional doubles titles. López was also an integral part of the Spanish Davis Cup team and helped his country win four Davis Cup titles. In 2022, López made his record 79th consecutive Grand Slam appearance at the Australian Open and his 81st overall main draw Grand Slam appearance at Wimbledon, a record he shares with Roger Federer. López announced on 1 January that the 2023 season would be his last on the tour; in a February interview with Spanish newspaper Marca, he revealed he hopes to make his final professional appearance at the Queen's Club Championships in June.
 Thomas Fabbiano announced his retirement in March 2023.

See also

 2023 WTA Tour
 2023 ATP Challenger Tour
 2023 ITF Men's World Tennis Tour

Notes

References

External links
 Association of Tennis Professionals (ATP) Tour official website
 International Tennis Federation (ITF) official website

 
ATP Tour seasons
ATP
ATP Tour